Gonippa is a monotypic moth genus of the family Erebidae. Its only species, Gonippa perusia, is found in Suriname. Both the genus and species were first described by Heinrich Benno Möschler in 1883.

References

External links
Original description: 

Calpinae
Monotypic moth genera